Cao Xian (曹憲) was a Chinese noble woman member of the aristocrat Cao family during the Three Kingdoms period at the end of the Han dynasty, She was the daughter of the warlord Cao Cao, the King of Cao Wei, and she was a noble consort of Emperor Xian. Initially, her title was Furen (夫人); in 214, her title upgraded to Guiren (貴人)

Cao Xian was elected to serve Emperor Xian of Han in 213 along with her two younger sisters, Cao Jie and Cao Hua. The three sisters entered the imperial court as consorts of Emperor Xian, in an attempt by Cao Cao to control the emperor. In 215, after Empress Fu Shou was assassinated for plotting against Cao Cao, he forced Emperor Xian to make Cao Jie an empress. 

There are no records of Cao Xian's life as Emperor Xian's consort, but her sister Cao Jie who was made empress resisted the coup d'état orchestrated by her half-brother, Cao Pi. The coup d'état resulted in the downfall of Emperor Xian and the eventual fall of the Han dynasty in favor of stabilizing the State of Cao Wei. After the fall of the Han Dynasty, Emperor Xian was demoted to a duke and Cao Jie to a duchess.

Cao Xian's fate is uncertain, it is likely that she returned to her family of origin after the fall of the Han Dynasty. She was buried in southern Bozhou.

References

Sources 
 Chen, Shou (3rd century). Records of the Three Kingdoms (Sanguozhi).
 Fan, Ye (5th century). Book of the Later Han (Houhanshu).

Family of Cao Cao
Year of birth unknown
3rd-century Chinese women
3rd-century Chinese people
Cao Cao and associates